Mike Reddick (born February 14, 1963) is an American retired basketball player.

High school and college career
Born in Savannah, Georgia, Reddick attended Sol C. Johnson High School. From 1980 to 1984, he played for Stetson University in Florida and averaged 11.2 points and 6.9 rebounds per game. In 1981, Reddick played with the United States student team in a tournament in Taiwan and later in Seoul. He was also named the most valuable player (MVP) of the 1981 Tangerine Bowl tournament, recording 20 points, 11 rebounds and three blocks in their championship game victory over Niagara. In the 1984 NBA draft, he was selected in the sixth round by the Milwaukee Bucks.

Professional career
Reddick started his professional career in 1984 with French club Saint Étienne, where he averaged 18.9 points and 12.1 rebounds in his rookie year. The following season he played with Belgian club Verviers.

From 1986 to 1989, Reddick played three seasons for Nashua Den Bosch and averaged 20.2 points in 127 games. He won two Eredivisie championships and was named the MVP of the 1987–88 season. Reddick also played in the FIBA European Champion's Cup with Den Bosch.

He continued his career in Italy with Reggiana (1989 to 1991), Varese (1992–93) and Reyer Venezia (1993–94). In the 1994–95 season, Reddick played in Turkey with Ülkerspor of the Basketbol Süper Ligi.

After his retirement, Reddick started his coaching career. He was the head coach of South Atlanta High School in 1994, where he coached future NBA player Derrick Favors.

References 

1963 births
Living people
American men's basketball players
American men's basketball coaches
Heroes Den Bosch players
RBC Pepinster players
Pallacanestro Reggiana players
Forwards (basketball)